Luís Manuel Gonçalves Silva (born 25 July 1995), commonly known as Reko, is a Portuguese footballer who plays for Penafiel as a midfielder.

External links

Stats and profile at LPFP 

1995 births
People from Barcelos, Portugal
Sportspeople from Braga District
Living people
Portuguese footballers
Association football midfielders
S.C. Braga B players
Vilaverdense F.C. players
Gil Vicente F.C. players
Associação Académica de Coimbra – O.A.F. players
AD Alcorcón footballers
F.C. Penafiel players
Liga Portugal 2 players
Campeonato de Portugal (league) players
Segunda División players
Portuguese expatriate footballers
Portuguese expatriate sportspeople in Spain
Expatriate footballers in Spain